Laugiidae is an extinct family of prehistoric sarcopterygian fishes which lived during the Triassic and Jurassic period. Their fossils has been found in Germany, Greenland and China.

Genera
 †Coccoderma
 †Laugia (type)
 †Trachymetopon

References 

 Peter L. Forey: History of the Coelacanth Fishes. Springer Verlag GmbH, 
 Karl Albert Frickhinger: Fossilien Atlas Fische, Mergus-Verlag, Melle, 1999, 

Prehistoric lobe-finned fish families
Triassic bony fish
Jurassic bony fish
Jurassic extinctions
Triassic first appearances